Fred Kohler (born 22 April 1920) is a German-born American inventor, author, and lecturer. He wrote about the human species becoming a "societal organism" (his original terminology) or super organism (in the popular modern usage) as a further development in the human evolution of life.

Biography

Early years
Kohler was born as Fritz Kohler in Nuremberg, Germany in 1920 into a secular, middle-class family of mostly German-Jewish ancestry. His mother died when he was eight years old and his father died when he was eleven. Kohler, an only child, was granted a life-saving visa as an orphan to enter the USA in 1935.

After graduating from Stuyvesant High School in New York City in 1937 he was admitted to Cooper Union, a highly competitive, "tuition-free" college where he was, in 1942, granted a degree in chemical engineering.

Kohler obtained American citizenship in 1943. Unable to join the Armed Forces in World War II because of eyesight problems, he engaged in war work as an engineer.

Kohler was married for several years in the 1950s, but he has no children nor close relatives.

In 1975 he obtained an M.A. from Southern Oregon University in Ashland, Oregon.

Career

Industrial activity
1946 - 1956  After World War II he started the Plastic Welding Company designing and building equipment for welding plastics.

1957 - 1965 Director of Research and Design, Thermatool corporation

1966 - 1967 Chief Engineer, Industrial Microwave Division of Eimac-Varian

Kohler continued to pursue his profession as a research engineer, as a designer of industrial electronic equipment, and as a consultant and lecturer. Kohler was granted many patents for various inventions in the course of his activities. Kohler's achievement with the greatest technological impact was patent 3243753 making possible the polyswitch, an automatically resetting circuit protection device which shuts off a circuit when a current overload is sensed but automatically resets when the surge is over, thus avoiding blown fuses and machine stoppages

Kohler's resettable fuse is now a passive component of many batteries in computers, VCRs, cars, and a host of other products.  The cumulative sales of protective devices utilizing this material have run into several billions of dollars. Kohler derived no monetary rewards from this invention.

Philosophical writings
In 1952 Kohler published through the publishing house, Philosophical Library a book entitled Evolution and Human Destiny that he started writing in 1950. In this book Kohler argued that there is an integration process in evolution, homologous with other consolidation processes that have occurred in the evolution of life during previous epochs, that is leading in the human species towards the formation of a Super Organism on a higher level of complexity, which Kohler originally called a "Societal Organism." In the form presented, this was a novel concept in 1952 and met with considerable skepticism, but also some support.

Kohler's book has been recently re-introduced to a new generation by being digitized on the internet by the initiative of the Marine Biology Laboratory.  Now the concept of an emerging super organism is far more acceptable to the intellectual community. Similar ideas are currently being expressed in several books, perhaps most clearly in Metaman,   by Dr. Gregory Stock and Lucy's Legacy by Dr. Alison Jolly.

In 2010 Kohler published on the internet through "Internet Archive" an essay entitled "Evolution and Human Destiny: Reflections of the Author Sixty Years after the Book was Written." In that essay he corrects the antiquated biology and chemistry of the original book, but re-affirms his central concepts. He also discusses some unsolved problems in cosmology and expresses gratification that the most important concepts in Evolution and Human Destiny have largely been vindicated during his lifetime. He also reflects on his own life in that essay.

Recent activity
Kohler lived as an adult in New York, Hawaii, California, Arizona and in Ashland, Oregon where he resided from 1984. He traveled widely and enjoyed good physical and mental health through his 90s. He enjoyed hiking on the Pacific Crest Trail and was active in discussions concerning the current status and future of humankind.

Works
 Evolution and Human Destiny. New York: Philosophical Library, 1952.
 Evolution and Human Destiny: Reflections of the Author Sixty Years after the Book was Written., Self-published / Internet Archive, 2010.

References

1920 births
Possibly living people
Bavarian emigrants to the United States
American inventors
Jewish emigrants from Nazi Germany to the United States
American philosophers
Jewish philosophers
Cooper Union alumni
Southern Oregon University alumni